Ryan Desmond Nell (born 4 September 1990 in Port Elizabeth) is a South African rugby union player for the  in the Currie Cup and Rugby ATL in Major League Rugby (MLR) in the United States. He is a utility back that can play as a centre, winger or full-back.

Career

Youth and Varsity Cup rugby

Western Province

Blue Bulls

Boland Cavaliers

He joined Wellington-based side  on trial prior to the 2016 season.

Rugby ATL

Nell joined Major League Rugby side Rugby ATL for the 2020 Major League Rugby season.

Sevens rugby

In 2012, he was included in the S.A. Sevens side and played in two tournaments in the 2011–12 IRB Sevens World Series, the 2012 Scotland Sevens and the 2012 London Sevens.

References

South African rugby union players
Living people
1990 births
Sportspeople from Port Elizabeth
Western Province (rugby union) players
South Africa international rugby sevens players
Blue Bulls players
Boland Cavaliers players
Pumas (Currie Cup) players
Rugby ATL players